György is a Hungarian version of the name George. Some notable people with this given name:

 György Alexits, as a Hungarian mathematician
 György Almásy, Hungarian asiologist, traveler, zoologist and ethnographer, father of László Almásy
 György Apponyi, Hungarian politician
 György Gordon Bajnai, Prime Minister of Hungary (2009-10)
 György Bálint (originally surname Braun; 1919–2020), Hungarian horticulturist, Candidate of Agricultural Sciences, journalist, author, and politician who served as an MP.
 György Bárdy, Hungarian film and television actor
 György Békésy, Hungarian biophysicist, awarded the Nobel Prize in Physiology or Medicine 
 György Bessenyei, Hungarian playwright and poet
 György Bródy, Hungarian water polo goalkeeper, 2x Olympic champion
 György Bulányi, Hungarian a Piarist priest, teacher, and leader 
 György Carabelli, Hungarian dentist 
 György Csányi, Hungarian athlete 
 György Cserhalmi, Hungarian actor
 György Csesznek, Hungarian aristocrat 
 György Csordás, Hungarian freestyle swimmer
 György Czakó, Hungarian figure skater
 György Cziffra, Hungarian virtuoso pianist
 György Dózsa, Székely man-at-arms from Transylvania
 György Enyedi (geographer), Hungarian economist and geographer 
 György Faludy, Hungarian-born poet, writer and translator
 György Fehér, Hungarian film director
 György Festetics, a Hungarian politician
 György Fráter, Croatian nobleman, Pauline monk and Hungarian statesman
 György Garics, Austrian football defender of Hungarian and Slovakian Croat roots
 György Gedó, Hungarian Olympic champion light flyweight boxer
 György Gerendás, Hungarian former water polo player
 György Gurics, Hungarian wrestler
 György Hajós, Hungarian mathematician
 György Hevesy, Hungarian radiochemist and awarded the Nobel Prize in Chemistry
 György Horkai,  Hungarian former water polo player
 György Káldy,   Hungarian Jesuit and Bible translator
 György Károly,  Hungarian poet and writer
 György Kárpáti,  Hungarian former water polo player 
 György Keleti, Hungarian politician, who served as Minister of Defence 
 György Kenéz,  Hungarian former water polo player 
 György Klapka,  Hungarian general
 György Klein, Hungarian–Swedish microbiologist and public intellectual
 György Kolonics, Hungarian sprint canoeist
 György Konrád, Hungarian novelist and essayist
 György Kulin, Hungarian astronomer
 György Kurtág, Hungarian composer
 György Kutasi, Hungarian water polo player
 György Lahner, Hungarian general
 György Ligeti, Hungarian composer
 György Lukács, Hungarian Marxist philosopher
 György Marx, Hungarian physicist, astrophysicist, science historian and professor
 György Matolcsy, Hungarian politician and economist, current governor of the Hungarian National Bank
 György Mitró, Hungarian swimmer and Olympic medalist
 György Moldova, Hungarian author
 György Oláh, Hungarian and American chemist and awarded the Nobel Prize in Chemistry
 György Orbán, Romanian-born Hungarian composer
 György Orth, Hungarian footballer and manager
 György Pazdera, Hungarian bassist
 György Petri, Hungarian poet
 György Piller, Hungarian Olympic and world champion fencer
 György Pólya, Hungarian mathematician
 I György Rákóczi, Prince of Transylvania from 1630 until 1648
 II György Rákóczi, Hungarian nobleman, Prince of Transylvania from 1648 until 1660
 György Sándor, Hungarian pianist
 György Sándor (footballer), Hungarian footballer
 György Sárosi, Hungarian footballer
 György Sebők, Hungarian-born American pianist 
 György Spiró, Hungarian dramatist, novelist and essayist
 György Szabados, Hungarian jazz pianist
 György Szepesi, Hungarian radio personality and sports executive
 György Szondy, 16th century Hungarian hero
 György Zala (sculptor), Hungarian sculptor
 George Worth, born György Woittitz (1915–2006), Hungarian-born American Olympic medalist fencer
 George Soros, born György Schwartz (1930-), Hungarian-born American investor

See also
 Gyorgyi (disambiguation)

Hungarian masculine given names